Districts are the principal administrative divisions of Brunei. The country is divided into four districts, namely Brunei-Muara, Belait, Tutong and Temburong. Temburong is an exclave; it is physically separated from the three  other districts by the Brunei Bay and Malaysian state of Sarawak. Each district has a town as its administrative and main economic centre, with the exception of Brunei-Muara, where the principal centre is Bandar Seri Begawan, a city and the country's capital.

History 
The country previously had six districts, namely Brunei, Muara, Limau Manis (also known as Ulu Brunei), Tutong, Belait and Temburong. In 1908 Brunei and Limau Manis were merged, and in 1938 the districts were restructured to form the present-day four districts.

Administration 
Each district is administered by a District Office, where District Offices are government departments under the Ministry of Home Affairs. The head of each department is a District Officer and appointed by the government.

A district is further divided into mukims, and subsequently each mukim consists of several villages. Each District Office manages the mukims and villages within its district.

The districts

See also
ISO 3166-2:BN

References

External links
 Districts of Brunei on Statoids.com

 
Subdivisions of Brunei
Brunei, Districts
Brunei 1
Districts, Brunei
Brunei geography-related lists